The 2019 Copa de la Superliga Final was the 49th and final match of the 2019 Copa de la Superliga. It was played on 2 June 2019 at the Estadio Mario Alberto Kempes in Córdoba between Tigre and Boca Juniors.

Tigre defeated Boca Juniors 2–0 to win their first Primera División title. As champions, Tigre qualified for the group stage of the 2020 Copa Libertadores. They also qualified for the 2019 Trofeo de Campeones de la Superliga Argentina.

As Boca Juniors and the semifinalist Atlético Tucumán had already qualified for the 2020 Copa Libertadores, the other semifinalist Argentinos Juniors won the 2020 Copa Sudamericana berth. Atlético Tucumán qualification allowed the qualification of Lanús for 2020 Copa Sudamericana.

Qualified teams

Road to the final

Note: In all results below, the score of the finalist is given first (H: home; A: away).

Match
Iván Marcone and Nahitan Nández (Boca Juniors) both missed out on the final due to suspension.

Details

Statistics

References

2019 in Argentine football
s
s